Barykino is a rural locality (a village) in Yesiplevskoye Rural Settlement, Kolchuginsky District, Vladimir Oblast, Russia. The population was 30 as of 2010.

Geography 
The village is located 8 km west from Yesiplevo, 18 km north-east Kolchugino.

References 

Rural localities in Kolchuginsky District